The Just Men of Cordova is a 1917 thriller novel by the British writer Edgar Wallace.

It is the third entry in a series that began with The Four Just Men in 1905 about a group of vigilantes battling against crime. The collection includes the completed version of “The Poisoners” a story first printed in the May 1912 issue of The Novel Magazine without an ending, but with a prize offered to the first reader who submitted the correct ending.

References

Bibliography
 Victor E. Neuburg. The Batsford Companion to Popular Literature. Batsford Academic and Educational, 1982.

1917 British novels
Novels by Edgar Wallace
British thriller novels